Alice Barrett (born December 19, 1956) is an American actress.

Biography 
She was born in New York, New York. She graduated from Hunter College with a bachelor's degree in theatre. She is also credited by her married name, Alice Barrett-Mitchell. Among her TV and movie credits, Alice is best known for her portrayal of offbeat, psychic private investigator Frankie Frame Winthrop on the soap opera Another World from 1989 to 1996. She played Jacqui McCormick on The Catlins from 1984-1985 and also appeared on As the World Turns and Ryan’s Hope.  She guest starred on the Season Finale of Season 12 of the hit TV show Law & Order: Special Victims Unit in the episode entitled "Smoked". She is the mother of two daughters..

Filmography 
 13
 Brooklyn's Finest
 Choke
 Law & Order: Special Victims Unit (season 12)
 Sandpiper
 Break a Leg
 Sonic Impact
 Eminent Domain
 Mission Hill

References

External links 

1956 births
American soap opera actresses
Living people
American stage actresses
American television actresses
21st-century American women